The 2001 World Archery Championships was the 41st edition of the event. It was held in Beijing, China on 16–23 September 2001 and was organized by World Archery Federation (FITA).

Medals table

Medals summary

Recurve

Compound

References

External links
 World Archery website
 Complete results

 
World Championship
World Archery
World Archery Championships
International archery competitions hosted by China